Boronia palasepala is a plant in the citrus family Rutaceae and is endemic to a small part of Queensland, Australia. It is an erect, rounded shrub with many branches, simple leaves and pink to white, four-petalled flowers.

Description
The eight stamens alternate in length, size and shape. Flowering occurs from July to September.

Taxonomy and naming
Boronia palasepala was first formally described in 1999 by Marco F. Duretto and the description was published in the journal Austrobaileya. According to Duretto, the specific epithet (palasepala) is derived from Latin pala (spade) and sepala (sepal) and alludes to the spade-shaped (as in the playing card suit) sepals. The botanical Latin word for "sepal" is sepalum.

Distribution and habitat
This boronia grows in open eucalypt forest or woodland on sandstone from near Monto to Biloela in Queensland.

Conservation
Boronia palasepala is classed as "least concern" under the Queensland Government Nature Conservation Act 1992.

References 

palasepala
Flora of Queensland
Plants described in 1999
Taxa named by Marco Duretto